LBG is a rock group from Chennai, India. It was formerly known as Little Babooshka's Grind. They are noted in the Indian rock music scene for performing only originals and no covers.

History 
LBG has existed since 1996 and started out playing the national college cultural circuit. In 1999, they decided that they had had enough of playing other people's music, so they set out to become one of the pioneers of performing original music in India.

LBG stands for the layers of talent that make up the band and their diverse music backgrounds that come together, thus creating the energetic and thought-provoking music.

They released their first album, This Animal is called the Wallet in 2004

Albums 
LBG released its second album Bad Children on 18 November 2006 with a special launch performance at Distil, Taj Connemara. The 11 song full-length album (short listed from over 25 songs) was the culmination of more than two years of song writing, dedication and hard work. The album was recorded over a three-month period, with the band taking time to reflect over the material and making the appropriate adjustments to bring their vision of a quintessential Indian rock album to reality. The band believes, as it did when it released its first album in 2004, that the songs reflect a certain state of mind as well as aspirations, fears and hopes for the future.

Tempered with a fair amount of aggression and well-rounded instrumentation, the album sees its members pushing the envelope in terms of what is normally considered an Indian rock album. It has also shot a video for "Basics of Life" that was premiered at Distil. Bad Children is a personification of the rebellious tone of the compilation and the band's journey & adventure on the 'road less traveled'  '''

They have performed in Unwind Center's 2004, 2005 and 2011  editions of JRO (June Rock Out) where they released their full-length album on 10 July 2004 and MCC's Octavia Showdown in September 2017.

Other Associations
LBG is backed by a professional advertising agency in Chennai called MMU Communications.

External links 
 
LBG Music Samples
LBG Music Video
Article in The Hindu - "Rock musicians finally getting their due"

References

Culture of Chennai
Indian musical groups
Indian rock music groups
Indian indie rock groups
Musical groups established in 1996